Nicola Morgan (née Griffith; born 1961) is a British author, best known for her novel, Mondays Are Red.

Biography
Nicola Griffith was born in 1961 to schoolteacher parents, who kept moving from school to school. Her father taught English and French and her mother taught mathematics and science. Her parents taught at boys' schools and when she was eleven, Nicola was sent to boarding school. She later went to Cambridge University where she read Classics and Philosophy.

Morgan wanted to become a writer after leaving university, but also took up a post as a teacher in a small school and taught English. Morgan also took a diploma in teaching people with reading and writing problems. Morgan set up a website, The Child Literacy Centre, to help parents help their children with all aspects of reading. She ran this until closing the service in 2009. In 2009, she started "Help! I Need a Publisher!", a blog for writers.

Writing
By 1999, Morgan had published dozens of best-selling home-learning books, while still working towards publication as a novelist. By 2010, she had published nine novels, all but one for teenagers, and five non-fiction books, including the internationally acclaimed Blame My Brain.

Bibliography

Fiction
Mondays are Red (2002)
Fleshmarket (2003)
Sleepwalking (2004)
The Passionflower Massacre (2005)
Chicken Friend (2006)
The Highwayman's Footsteps (2006)
The Highwayman's Curse (2007)
Deathwatch (2009)
Wasted (2010)

Non-fiction
Ancient Greece (2000)
Blame My Brain (2005; updated edition, 2013)
The Leaving Home Survival Guide (2005)
Know Your Brain (2007)
Reality Check: Curses (2008)
Write To Be Published (2011)
Tweet Right - The Sensible Person's Guide To Twitter (2011)
The Teenage Guide to Stress (2014)
The Teenage Guide to Friends (2017)
The Teenage Guide to Life Online (2018)
The Awesome Power of Sleep (2021)

References

Sources
 Official website

British non-fiction writers
1961 births
Living people
British women novelists
21st-century British novelists
Date of birth missing (living people)
Place of birth missing (living people)
21st-century British women writers